Peter Saburov may refer to:

 Peter Alexandrovich Saburov (1835–1918), diplomat, collector of antiquities, amateur chess player and patron of chess tournaments
 Peter Petrovich Saburov (1880–1932), Russian diplomat, chess master and organizer, and musical composer